Narcissus late season yellows virus (NLSYV) is a plant pathogenic Potyvirus of the family Potyviridae which infects plants of the genus Narcissus. It was originally isolated from N. pseudonarcissus in 1977.

Description 
Transmitted by aphids, it is one of the most widespread potyvirus infections in United Kingdom stocks. The infection is referred to as late season yellows disease, coming on after flowering, hence 'late', with chlorotic streaks of leaves and stem that are sharply defined  and pale green to yellow. The flowers are not affected. It is not transmitted to other genera.

References

Bibliography 
 Brunt, A.A. (1980). Acta Hort. 110: 23.

External links
ICTVdB - The Universal Virus Database: Narcissus late season yellows virus
Uniprot

Viral plant pathogens and diseases
Potyviruses